Kendis Marion Moore (born November 23, 1948), also known by her married name Kendis Drake, is an American former competition swimmer, Pan American Games medalist, and former world record-holder.

At the 1967 Pan American Games in Winnipeg, Canada, Moore received the silver medal for her second-place performance in the 200-meter backstroke.  She finished behind Canadian star Elaine Tanner and ahead of American teammate Cathy Ferguson.

Moore represented the United States at the 1968 Summer Olympics in Mexico City.  She competed in  the women's 100-meter backstroke, finishing in fourth place overall in the event final with a time of 1:08.3.

Moore broke two world records during her swimming career.  She set a new world record in the 200-meter butterfly of 2:26.3 on August 15, 1965; it was broken six days later by Ada Kok of the Netherlands.  She was also a member of a U.S. relay team that set a new world record in the 4×100-meter medley relay at the 1967 Pan American Games.  The medley relay record survived for thirteen months until it was broken by another team of Americans in 1968.

See also
 List of Arizona State University alumni
 World record progression 200 metres butterfly
 World record progression 4 × 100 metres medley relay

References

1948 births
Living people
American female backstroke swimmers
American female butterfly swimmers
Arizona State Sun Devils women's swimmers
World record setters in swimming
Olympic swimmers of the United States
Pan American Games gold medalists for the United States
Pan American Games silver medalists for the United States
People from Culver City, California
Swimmers at the 1967 Pan American Games
Swimmers at the 1968 Summer Olympics
Pan American Games medalists in swimming
Universiade medalists in swimming
Universiade gold medalists for the United States
Medalists at the 1967 Summer Universiade
Medalists at the 1967 Pan American Games
20th-century American women